Jordan Blake Weems (born November 7, 1992) is an American professional baseball pitcher for the Washington Nationals of Major League Baseball (MLB). He has previously played in MLB for the Oakland Athletics and Arizona Diamondbacks. He was drafted by the Boston Red Sox in the third round of the 2011 MLB draft and he made his MLB debut with the Athletics in 2020.

Career

Boston Red Sox
Weems was drafted by the Boston Red Sox as a catcher in the third round of the 2011 Major League Baseball Draft out of Columbus High School in Columbus, Georgia. Weems had committed to play college baseball at Georgia State. Weems made his professional debut with the GCL Red Sox. In 2012, Weems played for the Single-A Greenville Drive, batting .201/.308/.238 with 29 RBI. He returned to Greenville in 2013, where he hit .204/.301/.244 with 13 RBI in 61 games. For the 2014 season, Weems split the year between Greenville and the High-A Salem Red Sox, posting a cumulative .220/.324/.282 slash line with 1 home run and 15 RBI. In 2015, Weems split the season between Salem and the Double-A Portland Sea Dogs, slashing .244/.309/.355 in 48 games between the two teams.

After spending his first 5 years in the minor leagues as a catcher, Weems converted into a relief pitcher in 2016. In 19 games between the GCL Red Sox and the Low-A Lowell Spinners, Weems recorded a 3-0 record and 3.58 ERA. In 2017, Weems split the season between Salem, Greenville, and the GCL Red Sox, accumulating a 6-2 record and 4.10 ERA in 24 appearances. For the 2018 season, Weems split the year between Salem, Portland, and the Triple-A Pawtucket Red Sox, recording a cumulative 4-3 record and 3.36 ERA with 63 strikeouts in 59.0 innings of work between the three teams. In 2019, Weems returned to Portland and Pawtucket, pitching to a 4.37 ERA in 41 appearances between the two teams. On November 4, 2019, Weems elected free agency after 9 years in the Red Sox minor league system.

Oakland Athletics
On December 3, 2019, Weems signed a minor league contract with the Oakland Athletics organization. Weems made the Opening Day roster for Oakland and made his major league debut on July 28, 2020 against the Colorado Rockies, giving up 2 runs over 4 innings of work. He finished his rookie season with an ERA of 3.21 in 9 games. In 2021, Weems split time between the Triple-A Las Vegas Aviators and Oakland, recording a 6.23 ERA in 5 big league appearances before being designated for assignment on July 3, 2021.

Arizona Diamondbacks
On July 5, 2021, Weems was claimed off of waivers by the Arizona Diamondbacks. On August 12, 2021, Weems cleared waivers and was sent outright to the Triple-A Reno Aces.

Washington Nationals
On February 27, 2022, Weems signed a minor league deal with the Washington Nationals the deal included an invite to spring training. On May 31, Washington selected his contract to the active roster. Weems made a career-high 32 appearances for Washington, working to an 0-1 record and 5.22 ERA with 41 strikeouts in 39.2 innings pitched.

Weems was optioned to the Triple-A Rochester Red Wings to begin the 2023 season.

References

External links

1992 births
Living people
Baseball players from Columbus, Georgia
Major League Baseball pitchers
Oakland Athletics players
Arizona Diamondbacks players
Washington Nationals players
Gulf Coast Red Sox players
Greenville Drive players
Salem Red Sox players
Portland Sea Dogs players
Lowell Spinners players
Pawtucket Red Sox players
Las Vegas Aviators players
Reno Aces players
Rochester Red Wings players